The 5th Anti-Aircraft Missile Division of the Air Force (2nd formation) was activated on July 1, 1979, in Langfang, Beijing. The division was composed of the 16th, 26th and 27th Anti-aircraft Missile Regiments, being responsible for the anti-air defense of the southern vicinity of Beijing.

On November 5, 1985, the division was reduced to the 15th Anti-Aircraft Missile Brigade of the Air Force.

On December 26, 1993, the brigade was re-expanded to the 5th Anti-Aircraft Missile Division of the Air Force.

Composition (2010)
5th Anti-Aircraft Missile Division – Langfang, Hebei
3rd Anti-Aircraft Missile Regiment – Laishui County, Hebei
51st Anti-Aircraft Missile Battalion (HQ-2) – 
92nd Anti-Aircraft Missile Battalion (HQ-2)
93rd Anti-Aircraft Missile Battalion (HQ-2)
96th Anti-Aircraft Missile Battalion (HQ-2) – 
97th Anti-Aircraft Missile Battalion (HQ-2) – 
10th Anti-Aircraft Missile Regiment – Huolu, Hebei
36th Anti-Aircraft Missile Battalion (HQ-7) – 
37th Anti-Aircraft Missile Battalion (HQ-7) – 
70th Anti-Aircraft Missile Battalion (HQ-7) – 
95th Anti-Aircraft Missile Battalion (HQ-7)
13th Anti-Aircraft Missile Regiment – Tongzhou District, Beijing
3rd Anti-Aircraft Missile Battalion (S-300P) – 
33rd Anti-Aircraft Missile Battalion (S-300P) – 
56th Anti-Aircraft Missile Battalion (S-300P) – 
81st Anti-Aircraft Missile Battalion (S-300P) –

References
中国空军地空导弹第五师, http://www.dser.com/lslt/tanke01/201410/00002283.html
全国空军地址、番号大全, http://blog.sina.com.cn/s/blog_6fb3077d0101o956.html

Divisions of the People's Liberation Army
Air defence units and formations